Shirvani or Shiruni may refer to:
 Shirvani, Fars
 Shirvani, West Azerbaijan

See also
Shirvan (disambiguation)